Common Indic Number Forms is a Unicode block containing characters for representing fractions in north India, Pakistan, and Nepal.

History
The following Unicode-related documents record the purpose and process of defining specific characters in the Common Indic Number Forms block:

References 

Unicode blocks